Mérinchal is a commune in the Creuse department in the Nouvelle-Aquitaine region in central France.

Geography
The commune has the department of Puy-de-Dôme on its eastern border and is also the source of the river Cher. Until 2008 the commune was served by two railway stations on the now closed line from Montluçon to Eygurande–Merlines.

Population

Sights
 The church, dating from the twelfth century.
 The remains of a twelfth-century castle at La Mothe.
 The remains of a chateau at Villebrune.
 The seventeenth-century chateau du Vieux-Voisin.
 Chapels at Villelume, La Mothe and La Vernède

International relations
Mérinchal is twinned with Öhningen, Germany since 1984.

See also
Communes of the Creuse department

References

Communes of Creuse